The Angel Island–Tiburon Ferry Company is a privately owned and operated ferry service in California that links Tiburon's Tiburon Ferry Terminal with Ayala Cove Ferry Terminal on Angel Island. The ferry runs every day except Thanksgiving and Christmas. The company also operates San Francisco Bay and whale watching cruises.

The owner and frequent ferry operator is Maggie McDonogh, who has maintained the service since 1959. The concession is occasionally put out to bid by the California Department of Parks and Recreation, though McDonogh has operated month to month since 1993. The 2018 bidding process attracted only one application from Blue & Gold Fleet. Despite this,  the process has been placed on hold, with McDonogh still running ferries.

References

External links
 
 Angel Island State Park

1959 establishments in California
Ferry companies of California
Public transportation in Marin County, California
Tiburon, California